WDHS, virtual and VHF digital channel 8, was a television station licensed to Iron Mountain, Michigan, United States, which served the Central and Western Upper Peninsula of Michigan. The station was owned by Withers Broadcasting Companies, along with WDTV in Weston–Clarksburg, West Virginia. WDHS' transmitter was located on East B Street in Iron Mountain.

The station was dark for much of its history; it came on the air only for a short period on an annual basis merely as a way to keep its Federal Communications Commission (FCC) license active. The WDHS license was canceled on November 19, 2015, months after an FCC policy change negated the "once per year broadcast" method of retaining a station license which had been exploited in the radio industry to "warehouse" prominent call letters in small markets, along with television broadcasters holding out for sales partners.

When WDHS was on the air, it theoretically could serve parts of Baraga, Delta, Dickinson, Gogebic, Houghton, Iron, Marquette and Menominee counties in Michigan, and Florence, Forest, Langlade, Marinette, Oconto, Oneida and Vilas counties in Wisconsin. Most likely, it only broadcast at a low power to save electricity and fulfill the legal fiction of maintaining the license.

References

External links 
WDHS information at Michiguide.com

DHS
Television channels and stations established in 1986
1986 establishments in Michigan
Television channels and stations disestablished in 2015
2015 establishments in Michigan
Defunct television stations in the United States
Dickinson County, Michigan
DHS